The Federal Intelligence Agency mostly known for its abbreviation AFI, is the principal intelligence agency of Argentina.

This organization is the successor to the Secretariat of Intelligence (mostly known for its acronym "SIDE") and has two purposes: to collect national intelligence for governmental needs and criminal intelligence. It also was transferred from the Ministry of Security, to the National Criminal Intelligence.

The agency was created by Law 27126 3 amending the National Intelligence Act entering into force 120 days after enactment of the Act. According to regulations shall govern all communication by the Director General or Deputy Director General any interaction being punished by the members of the AFI any action or relationship regulated by the law establishing the Federal Intelligence Agency. In turn AFI officials should make affidavits without distinction of degrees.

Overview 
This agency is ruled by the Law of National Intelligence #25,520, promulgated in March 2015 and entered into force 120 days after that. Changes to previous legislation include the dissolution of Secretariat of Intelligence, with the AFI as its successor. Likewise, the Ministry of Security transferred the "National Direction of Criminal Intelligence" to AFI.

The organism was put under the Supreme Court in 2015, alleging that "...the execution of a communication intervention order is carried out by a body other than the one that is part of the investigation"

The Argentinian Federal Prosecutor Cecilia Incardona indictment against the director of the AFI Gustavo Arribas and the presidential employee Silvia Majdalani in 2020, for illegal espionage against 50 politicians, including the then president Cristina Kirchner in 2018. A group of 18 employees is said to have spied on Kirchner's notebooks, among other things.

Board 
The AFI main authorities (general director and vice-director) are appointed by the President of Argentina, then confirmed by the Senate. Their functions are regulated by Law 25,520. Prosecutor Cristina Caamaño was the interventor until 2022. She was appointed in December 2019 by President Alberto Fernández.
Since June 8, 2022 Agustin Rossi is the director of the Federal Intelligence Agency (AFI).

References

External links 
 

Argentine intelligence agencies
Counterintelligence agencies
Government agencies established in 2015
Government buildings in Argentina
Buildings and structures in Buenos Aires
Buildings and structures completed in 1929